is a Japanese sprinter who specialises in the 200 metres. He is a one-time Asian champion and two-time national champion in the event and has a personal best of 20.13 seconds. He is also a bronze medalist in the 4 × 100 metres relay at the 2017 World Championships. He holds the Asian best in the rarely-contested 300 metres.

Personal bests

Achievements

National titles
Japanese Championships
200 m: 2010, 2015

See also
List of World Athletics Championships medalists (men)
List of Asian Games medalists in athletics
List of 200 metres national champions (men)

References

External links
 
 
 
 
 
 

1986 births
Living people
Sportspeople from Saitama (city)
Japanese male sprinters
Olympic male sprinters
Olympic athletes of Japan
Athletes (track and field) at the 2016 Summer Olympics
Asian Games gold medalists for Japan
Asian Games silver medalists for Japan
Asian Games medalists in athletics (track and field)
Athletes (track and field) at the 2010 Asian Games
Athletes (track and field) at the 2014 Asian Games
Medalists at the 2010 Asian Games
Medalists at the 2014 Asian Games
World Athletics Championships athletes for Japan
World Athletics Championships medalists
Japan Championships in Athletics winners
20th-century Japanese people
21st-century Japanese people